Miss Universe 2008 was the 57th Miss Universe pageant, held at the Crown Convention Center in Nha Trang, Vietnam on July 14, 2008. This was the first time that the Miss Universe pageant was broadcast in 1080i High-definition.

At the end of the event, Riyo Mori of Japan crowned Dayana Mendoza as Miss Universe 2008. It is Venezuela's first victory in 12 years, and the fifth victory of the country in the pageant's history.

Contestants from 80 countries and territories competed in this year's pageant. The pageant was hosted by Jerry Springer and member of the UK pop group Spice Girls Mel B. American singer-songwriter Lady Gaga performed in this year's pageant.

The competition also featured the debut of the new CAO Fine Jewelry Crown, which was designed by the Phu Nhuan Jewelry Company and Vietnamese-American jewelry designer Rosalina Lydster. The crown is made with 18k white and yellow gold and platinum, with over 1,000 precious stones including  of diamonds. The crown is said to be worth $120,000, and will only be awarded in this edition. The Phoenix Mikimoto Crown will still be used by the winner.

Background

Location and date 
In August 2007, representatives of the Miss Universe Organization visited cities that bid to host the pageant such as Dubai and Hanoi to evaluate if these cities can host the pageant. During their stay in Vietnam, Paula Shugart, President of the Miss Universe Organization, also visited the cities of Nha Trang and Da Lat.

On September 26, 2007, the Vietnamese government approved the proposal of Khánh Hòa to host the pageant in Nha Trang in May 2008. This was the first major U.S.-based television production in Vietnam since the end of the Vietnam War. On November 27, 2007, the Miss Universe Organization officially announced at the Sheraton Hotel in Ho Chi Minh City that the competition will take place at the Diamond Bay Resort in Nha Trang on July 14, 2008.

The Crown Convention Center, a 7,500-seat indoor arena with an area of 10,000 square-meters was built for the pageant. It is located at the Diamond Bay Resort and was opened on June 30, 2008. It is the third biggest Convention Center in Southeast Asia.

Selection of participants 
Contestants from 80 countries and territories were selected to compete in the competition. Two of these delegates were appointees to their positions after being a runner-up of their national pageant or being selected through a casting process, while six were selected to replace the original dethroned winner.

Miss Estonia 2008 Kadri Nõgu was replaced by Julia Kovaljova, the first runner-up of Miss Estonia 2008, due to undisclosed reasons. Laura Tanguy, the second runner-up of Miss France 2008, was appointed to represent France after Valérie Bègue, Miss France 2008, was not allowed to compete in international beauty pageants after suggestive photos of her appeared in the media shortly after her crowning. Nino Likuchova, Miss Georgia 2007 was stripped of her title after revealing that she was abducted at the age of 16 and was forced to marry without the consent of her parents. Her first runner-up, Nino Lekveishvili was chosen to take over the title. However, Lekveishvili was also found out to be married. Due to this, Gvantsa Daraselia was appointed to represent Georgia at Miss Universe. Vera Krasova, the first runner-up of Miss Russia 2007, was appointed to represent Russia after Ksenia Sukhinova, Miss Russia 2007, was unable to compete due to her studies. Claudia Moro was appointed as the representative of Spain after Patricia Yurena Rodríguez, Miss Spain 2008, couldn't participate because she did not meet the minimum age requirements. However, Rodríguez competed at Miss Universe five years later. Bojana Borić, the second runner-up of Miss Serbia 2007, was appointed to represent Serbia after Zorana Tasovac, the first runner-up of Miss Serbia 2007, withdrew due to undisclosed reasons.

The 2008 edition saw the debut of Kosovo and the return of the Cayman Islands, Ghana, Guam, Ireland, the Netherlands, Sri Lanka, Trinidad and Tobago, the United Kingdom, and Vietnam. Guam last competed in 2000, the Netherlands and Vietnam last competed in 2005, while the others last competed in 2006. Barbados, Belize, Bulgaria, Guyana, Lebanon, Saint Lucia, the US Virgin Islands, and Zambia withdrew. Tanisha Vernon of Belize withdrew due to internal issues between her and her national organization. Barbados, Bulgaria, Guyana, Lebanon, Saint Lucia, the US Virgin Islands, and Zambia withdrew after their respective organizations failed to hold a national competition or appoint a delegate.

Results

Placements

Final Scores

Special awards

Pageant

Format 
Same with 2007, 15 semifinalists were chosen through the preliminary competition— composed of the swimsuit and evening gown competitions and closed-door interviews. The top 15 competed in the swimsuit competition and were narrowed down to the top 10 afterward. The top 10 competed in the evening gown competition and were narrowed down to the top 5 afterward. The top 5 competed in the question and answer round and the final look.

Selection committee

Final telecast 

 Jennifer Hawkins – Miss Universe 2004
 Roberto Cavalli – Italian fashion designer and entrepreneur
 Nadine Velazquez – Puerto Rican actress from the television series My Name is Earl
 Louis Licari – Celebrity hairdresser and beauty expert
 Donald Trump Jr. – Executive Vice President of The Trump Organization
 Nguyen Cong Che – Vietnamese journalist
 Joe Cinque – CEO and President of the American Academy of Hospitality Sciences
 Taryn Rose – Shoe designer
 Eesha Koppikhar – Indian actress and singer

Contestants 
80 contestants competed for the title.

Notes

References

External links

 Miss Universe official website

2008 in Vietnam
2008
Nha Trang
2008 beauty pageants
Beauty pageants in Vietnam
July 2008 events in Asia